Édouard Martin (born 15 June 1963) is a Spanish-born French politician from the Socialist Party. He was a Member of the European Parliament from 2014 to 2019.

See also 

 List of members of the European Parliament for France, 2014–2019

References 

1963 births

Living people
21st-century French politicians
Socialist Party (France) MEPs
MEPs for East France 2014–2019
Spanish emigrants to France